Justin is a masculine given name of Latin origin. It is the anglicized form of the Latin given name Justinus, a derivative of Justus, meaning "just", "fair", or "righteous". Justinus was the name borne by various early saints, notably a 2nd-century Christian apologist and a boy martyr of the 3rd century. The name is also related to the similar Latin name Justinian. As an English name, Justin is common particularly in the English-speaking world starting in the latter half of the 20th century.

People named Justin 

Justin (historian) (Latin: Junianus Justinus), a 3rd-century Roman historian
Justin I (c. 450–527), or Flavius Iustinius Augustus, Eastern Roman Emperor who ruled from 518 to 527
Justin II (c. 520–578), or Flavius Iustinius Iunior Augustus, Eastern Roman Emperor who ruled from 565 to 578
Justin (magister militum per Illyricum) (fl. 538–552), Byzantine general
Justin (gnostic), 2nd-century Gnostic Christian
Justin (Moesia) (d. 528), Byzantine general killed in battle in 528
Justin (consul 540) (c. 525–566), a Byzantine general
Iustin Moisescu (1910–1986), a Patriarch of the Romanian Orthodox Church
Justin Ahomadégbé-Tomêtin (1917–2002), former prime minister of Dahomey (now Benin)
Justin Allgaier (born 1986), American racing driver
Justin Amash (born 1980), U.S. Congressman from Michigan.
Justin Arop (1958–1994), Ugandan javelin thrower
Justin Baldoni (born 1984), American actor, director and activist
Justin Bean (born 1996), American basketball player
Justin Berry (born 1986), American pornographer
Justin Bieber (born 1994), Canadian musician
Justin Blackmon (born 1990), American football player
Justin Blau, American DJ and electronic music producer known as 3LAU
Justin Boren (born 1988), American National Football League football player
Justin Brannan (born 1978), American musician and writer
Justin Briner, American voice actor
Justin Broadrick (born 1969), British musician
Justin Brown (aquanaut), American aquanaut
Justin Brown (defensive lineman), American and Canadian football defensive end
Justin Brown (wide receiver), American football wide receiver
Justin Bruihl (born 1997), American baseball player
Justin Burnette, American former child actor
Justin Carmack (1981–2000), American child actor
Justin Caruso, American DJ and record producer
Justin Chancellor, English bassist for band Tool
Justin Andrew Channing (b. 1968), English former footballer
Justin Chatwin (born 1982), Canadian actor
Justin Chon (born 1981), American actor
Justin Connolly (1933–2020), British composer and teacher
Justin Cook, American voice actor
Justin Credible, the best-known ring persona of American professional wrestler Peter Polaco
Justin Deeley, American actor
Justin Doellman (born 1985), American basketball player
Justin Dunn (born 1995), American baseball player
Justin Emerle (born 1976), American musician
Justin Evans (American football) (born 1995), American football player
Justin Fairfax, American attorney and politician
Justin Ferizaj (born 2005), Irish football player
Justin Fields (born 1999), American football player
Justin Fletcher, British children's TV personality
Justin Flowe (born 2001), American football player
Justin Forsett, American football player
Justin Furstenfeld, American musician
Justin Gaethje, American MMA fighter
Justin Gatlin, American sprinter
Justin Gimelstob (born 1977), American tennis player
Justin Gnanapragasam (born 1948), Sri Lankan Tamil Roman Catholic priest, Bishop of Jaffna since 2015
Justin Goldberg, American music and film industry executive
Justin Gonzales, American politician
Justin Grimm (born 1988), American baseball player
Justin Guarini, American singer
Justin Hall (born 1974), American blogger and journalist
Justin Harper (disambiguation), the name of an American basketball player and an American football player
Justin Harrison, Australian rugby player
Justin Hartley (born 1977), American actor
Justin Hawkins, frontman for the English glam rock band The Darkness
Justin Hayward (born 1946), English musician; vocalist, songwriter, and guitarist for The Moody Blues
Justin Hemmes (born 1972/73), Australian businessman
Justin Henry, American actor
Justin Herbert (born 1998), American football player
Justin Herron (born 1995), American football player
Justin Hilliard (born 1998), American football player
Justin Hodges, an Australian rugby league footballer
Justin Holl (born 1992), American ice hockey defenceman
Justin Hollins (born 1996), American football player
Justin Horo, New Zealand Rugby League player
Justin Houston, American football player
Justin Hunt (filmmaker), American documentary filmmaker
Justin Hunt (rugby league), Australian footballer 
Justin Jackson (disambiguation), multiple people
Justin Jayasuriya, Sri Lankan Sinhala navy rear admiral
Justin Jefferson (born 1999), American football player
Justin Jones (disambiguation), multiple people
Justin Kane, Australian boxer
Justin Kirk (born 1969), American actor
Justin Knapp, Wikipedia editor
Justin Lawler (born 1994), American football player
Justin Lawrence (disambiguation), multiple people
Justin Layne (born 1998), American football player
Justin Lin, Taiwanese American director
Changjoon Justin Lee, neuroscientist specializing in glioscience
Justin Lee Collins, English comedian and TV presenter
Justin Gorham (born 1998), American basketball player in the Israeli Basketball Premier League
Justin Lewis (disambiguation), multiple people
Justin Lo (born 1976), Hong Kong singer
Justin Long (born 1978), American actor
Justin Madubuike (born 1997), American football player
Justin Maese (born 1996), American professional baseball player
Justin Marshall, New Zealand rugby player and pundit
Justin Martyr (c. 100/114–c. 162/168), an early Christian apologist
Justin McElroy (born 1980), American podcaster and co-founder of Polygon
Justin Meccage (born 1980), American baseball coach
Justin Moon, Korean-born American businessman and firearms designer; son of Unification Church founder Sun Myung Moon
Justin Moore, American country singer
Justin Morneau, Canadian baseball player; first baseman for the Colorado Rockies
Justin S. Morrill, U.S. Representative and Senator from Vermont and sponsor of the Land Grant College Act
Justin Mylo, Dutch DJ and electronic music producer 
Justin Narayan, Australian youth pastor and chef
Justinus van Nassau, Dutch army commander
Justin O'Dell, American clarinetist and professor
Justin Osuji, Scottish music producer, singer and songwriter
 Justin Patton (born 1997), American basketball player for Hapoel Eilat of the Israeli Basketball Premier League
Justin Phillips (disambiguation), multiple people
Justin Pieris Deraniyagala (1903–1967), Sri Lankan Sinhala painter
Justin Pierre, singer in the band Motion City Soundtrack
Justin Pitts, American basketball player
Justin Prentice (born 1994), American actor
Justin Prime, Dutch DJ, electronic music producer and sound engineer
Justin Raimondo, American libertarian conservative author
Justin Arthur Rambukpota (1891–1955), Sri Lankan Sinhala politician
Justin Reid (born 1997), American football player
Justin Roiland, American voice actor
Justin Roper, American football player
Justin Rose, English golfer
Justin Ryan, Scottish interior designer and television presenter
Justin Francis Rigali, Cardinal Archbishop of Philadelphia
Justin Ring, Canadian football player
Justin Rohrwasser (born 1996), American football player
Justin Samarasekera (1916–2003), Sri Lankan architect 
Justin Senior (born 1994), American football player
Justin Shafer, American baseball player
Justin Shaffer (born 1998), American football player
Justin Simon (born 1996), American basketball player
Justin Skule (born 1996), American football player
Justin Staples (born 1989), American football player
Justin Steele (born 1995), American baseball player
Justin Strnad (born 1996), American football player
Justin Sumpter (born 1996), American football player
Justin Swift (born 1975), American football player
Justin Theroux (born 1971), American actor
Justin Thomas (American football) (born 1994), American football player
Justin Tillman (born 1996), American basketball player for Hapoel Tel Aviv in the Israeli Basketball Premier League
Justin Timberlake (born 1981), American singer-songwriter, actor, and record producer
Justin Tipping, American film and television director
Justin Topa (born 1991), American baseball player
Justin Tornow, American dancer and choreographer
Justin Tranter, singer for the band Semi Precious Weapons
Justin Trudeau (born 1971), Canadian politician, 23rd Prime Minister of Canada
Justin Tuck, American football player for the New York Giants
Justin Tucker, American football placekicker for the Baltimore Ravens
Justin Turner, American baseball player
Justin Turner (rugby union), Australian rugby union footballer
Justin Upton, American baseball player
Justin Verlander (born 1983), American baseball player
Justin Vernon, singer in the band Bon Iver
Justin Watson (wide receiver) (born 1995), American football player
Justin Welby, the current archbishop of Canterbury
Justin Wijayawardhene (1904–1982), Sri Lankan teacher, author, and politician
Justin Williams, Canadian professional ice hockey right winger who last played for the Washington Capitals
Justin Wilson (disambiguation), multiple people
Justin Young (singer, born 1978), Hawaiian singer-songwriter
Justin Young (singer, born 1987), English musician, singer, and songwriter
Justin Yerbury, Australian scientist
Justin Wilson (disambiguation), the name of several people
Saint Justin (disambiguation), the name of several saints

Fictional characters

 Justin, a character in the Canadian animated series Total Drama
 Justin, a character in the children's novel Mrs. Frisby and the Rats of NIMH and the film adaptation The Secret of NIMH
Justin Barber, a character on the American soap opera The Bold and the Beautiful
Justin Bazini, a racist billionaire in the Darren Shan zombie apocalyptic novel series Zom-B
Justin Burton, character in TV soap opera Hollyoaks
Brother Justin Crowe, character in the American television serial drama Carnivàle
 Justin Finch Fletchley, Harry Potter character.
 Justin Foley, a character in the novel and Netflix series 13 Reasons Why
Justin (Grandia), protagonist of the video game Grandia
Justin Gregory, a character in the 1993 American comedy movie Mrs. Doubtfire
Justin Hammer, a longstanding Iron Man villain.
Justin Kiriakis, a character on the American soap opera Days of Our Lives
Justin Pitt, Elaine Benes's boss on Seinfeld
Justin Russo, Wizards of Waverly Place character
Justin Stewart, Blue Turbo Ranger from Power Rangers Turbo
Justin Suarez, Ugly Betty character
Justin Taylor, character in American-Canadian Showtime television series Queer as Folk
Justin Viele, American baseball coach

Cognates 

 Albanian: Justinian
Bulgarian: Юстин (Yustin)
Catalan: Justí
Cornish: Yestin
Dutch: Justin (Joost)
Esperanto: Justino
Finnish: Jussi
French: Justin
Galician: Xustino
 German: Justinian, Jobst
 Greek: Ιουστίνος (Ioustinos)
Hawaiian: Iukekini
Hebrew: יוסטינוס
 Hungarian: Jusztin
 Irish: Saorbhreathach
 Italian: Giustino
Latin: Iustinius (IVSTINIVS), Iustinus (IVSTINVS)
Latvian: Džastins, Justins, Justs
Lithuanian: Justinas/Justas
Maltese: Ġustinu
 Polish: Justyn
 Portuguese: Justino
Romanian: Iustin
 Russian: Устин (Ustin)
Serbo-Croatian: Јустин / Justin
Sicilian: Giustinu
Slovene: Justin
 Spanish: Justino
 Ukrainian: Устим (Ustym)
 Welsh: Iestyn

See also

References 

English masculine given names
French masculine given names
Latin masculine given names